The Jewish Social Democratic Labour Party (Poalei Zion) was a Zionist socialist political party in the Russian Empire and Ukraine. The party was founded in 1906 in Poltava. Members of the party participated in the government of Ukraine in 1917-20. It was part of the international Poalei Zion movement. Due to its position towards the October Revolution and being a strong supporter of the Russian Constituent Assembly, the party was banned from most of Soviets dominated by the RSDLP(b), but was not recognized illegal until 1928.

The party suffered a major split in August 1919, when a dissident group formed the Jewish Communist Party (Poalei Zion). After the JCP(PZ) had merged into the Communist Party in 1922, the JSDLP(PZ) changed name to the Jewish Communist Labour Party (Poalei Zion) (known by its Yiddish acronym א.ק.א.פ. (פועלי ציון)). Its Yiddish organ, Der proletarisher gedank ('Proletarian Thought'), was published from Moscow 1926-1927, replacing its Moscow central Russian organ Evreiskaya proletarskaya mysl ('Jewish Proletarian Thought', 1920-1926). The 12th conference of the party was held in Moscow March 11–18, 1926. The party opposed the policy of regionalization of the Soviet Union. The party was completely banned and dissolved in 1928 when most of its member either joined the Communist movement or quit the party.

Participation in Ukrainian politics
The party was represented in the Central Council of Ukraine in 1917 and in the Council of National Ministers of the Ukrainian National Republic (executive branch of the Ukrainian National Republic) the Poalist Abraham Revutsky was minister of Jewish affairs. Another Poalist, Solomon Goldelman, was deputy minister of trade and industry and of labour in the Directory of the Ukrainian National Republic (state authority created by the Ukrainian National Union on 14 November 1918).

See also
 Jewish Communist Party (Poalei Zion)
 Jewish Communist Union (Poalei Zion)
 Jewish Communist Workers Youth Union (Iugend Poalei Zion)
 Mifleget Poale Zion VeHaHugim HaMarksistim beEretz Yisrael
 Poale Zion

References

Poale Zion
Communist parties in the Soviet Union
Jewish political parties
Jewish socialism
Labour parties
Political parties established in 1906
Political parties disestablished in 1928
Secular Jewish culture in Europe
Zionism in Russia
Zionist political parties in Europe
1906 establishments in the Russian Empire
Political parties of the Russian Revolution
Political parties of minorities in Imperial Russia